Madeira Tecnopolo is a Free Science Park in Funchal, Madeira, Portugal, .

ICEC Centre

Within the Tecnopolo park is the ICEC Exhibition and Congress Centre, the largest indoor arena on the island. As well as various conferences and exhibitions, including Portugal Fashion, it has also held events such as the 2003 World Men's Handball Championship and a Harlem Globetrotters match. The arena can hold up to 2,500 people for sports events.

External links

Madeira Tecnopolo official website

Science parks in Portugal
Buildings and structures in Madeira
Funchal